The Pakistan cricket team toured Scotland to play two Twenty20 International (T20I) matches at The Grange Club, Edinburgh, on 12 and 13 June 2018. Pakistan last toured Scotland in May 2013 to play two One Day Internationals. Both teams last met in a T20I fixture in the group stage of the 2007 ICC World Twenty20 tournament. This was the first time that Scotland had played a home T20I match against a full member side.

The tour followed Pakistan's tour of England and their one Test series in Ireland. England also played a single ODI against Scotland on 10 June at the same ground. In May 2018, Cricket Scotland named a provisional 24-man squad for the matches against England and Pakistan. Pakistan won the two-match series 2–0.

Squads

T20I Series

1st T20I

2nd T20I

References

External links
 Series home at ESPN Cricinfo

2018 in Pakistani cricket
2018 in Scottish cricket
June 2018 sports events in the United Kingdom
International cricket competitions in 2018
Pakistani cricket tours of Scotland